Matthew Robert Smith (born 22 November 1999) is a professional footballer who plays as a midfielder for  club Milton Keynes Dons and the Wales national team.

Club career

Manchester City
Having initially joined the academy of West Bromwich Albion at a young age, in 2013 Smith moved to the academy of Manchester City, where he progressed through several age groups.

In July 2018 at the age of 18, Smith joined Dutch Eerste Divisie club FC Twente on a season-long loan, eventually making 37 appearances and scoring 2 goals, playing a key role in the club's promotion to the Eredivisie. Over the next two seasons, he was again sent out on loan to EFL Championship clubs Queens Park Rangers and Charlton Athletic, as well as EFL League One club Doncaster Rovers, making over 40 appearances for the latter. Ahead of the 2021–22 season, on 6 August 2021 Smith joined EFL Championship club Hull City on another season-long loan.

Milton Keynes Dons
On 31 January 2022, following limited opportunities with Hull, Smith was recalled from his loan and immediately transferred to League One club Milton Keynes Dons on a permanent deal for an undisclosed fee. He made his debut for the club on 8 February 2022, in a 1–1 draw away to Fleetwood Town.

International career
Born in England, Smith qualifies for the Welsh national team through his grandfather who is from Gwent in Wales. 

Smith has played for Wales at U17, U19, U21 and senior level, often captaining the side at youth level. He received a first call-up to the senior squad on 20 May 2018.

He made his senior debut for Wales in a friendly 0–0 tie with Mexico, replacing Tom Lawrence after 81 minutes. In May 2021 he was selected for the Wales squad for the delayed UEFA Euro 2020 tournament. In November 2022 he was named in the Wales squad for the 2022 FIFA World Cup in Qatar.

Career statistics

Club

International

Honours
FC Twente
Eerste Divisie: 2018–19

References

External links

 Manchester City profile
 
 UEFA Youth League Profile
 Premier League Profile
 

1999 births
Living people
Sportspeople from Redditch
Association football midfielders
Welsh footballers
Wales youth international footballers
Wales under-21 international footballers
Wales international footballers
English footballers
English people of Welsh descent
Manchester City F.C. players
FC Twente players
Queens Park Rangers F.C. players
Charlton Athletic F.C. players
Doncaster Rovers F.C. players
Hull City A.F.C. players
Milton Keynes Dons F.C. players
English Football League players
Eerste Divisie players
UEFA Euro 2020 players
2022 FIFA World Cup players
Welsh expatriate footballers
Welsh expatriate sportspeople in the Netherlands
Expatriate footballers in the Netherlands